The Saunders Brothers Show is a Canadian Comedy/Celtic band from Nova Scotia. Billed as "East Coast music with a twist", the band is well known for their outrageously comedic bantering demeanor and audience participation, complemented by extreme flexibility in terms of musical genres, ranging from folk and country/pop to Gospel and East Coast traditional all flavored with a unique twist.

Biography
The band The Saunders Brothers Show was formed in 2004 by brothers Ed and Terry Saunders plus Brian Smeltzer. The band's first media exposure occurred in April 2006 when their comedic song Hot Wings was featured on Q-104 Halifax.

The band's popularity grew steadily, culminating in November 2006 when the band recorded their first single, the pop/rock flavored Hallelujah at Nova Scotia's Denmark productions. The song, which released in time for the holiday season, was well-received, being included on the holiday playlists of fifteen different radio stations.

In 2007, The Saunders Brothers Show released their debut self-titled The Saunders Brothers Show, again through Denmark Productions. Several tracks from the album, notably I love you, but then I ain't too bright, Me love is Me Boat received feature radio play, and You're Sailing Without Me scored National recognition as a FACTOR $2,000 Outstanding Original winner. Other cuts including Belly Yourself to the Bar, Chug, and their covers of Sonny's Dream and Banks of the Ohio became popular crowd pleasers for their increasingly broad range of performances.

2008, their second album, Gospel-ish, featured a light-hearted approach to inspirational songs.  Ed's original about fighting addiction - Fire of My God in My Eyes - became a multiple award winner, being recognized by the International Song of the Year Awards, the Nashville Paramount Song Contest, and The Billboard World Song Contest. Other popular tracks included a partnership with members of the Indian Harbour Church Community Kids Choir on Terry's tribute for fishermen Fishers of Men Blessings. Heed the Call, Ì Just Don't See it` and covers of classics including Uncloudy Day and Soul of Man rounded out this fundraising partnership.

2014 the album SINGLES was released.  Their third at Denmark Productions, this project included 12 original songs highlighting some incredible musical collaborations.  The Billboard Song Award and Song of the Year Award track The Man You Used to be features a stunning vocal from Christine Campbell and touching cello from John Spearns.  Dumping Day, the story of the first day of the lobster season in Peggys Cove Nova Scotia featured fiddling by Alycia Putnam and received widespread feature radio support.   Let`s Get Naughty included naughty taunts by comedian Candy Palmater, a washboard tie scratched by Robert Dill and was one of 8 tracks featuring percussionist Geoff Arsenault.  Other performers on the album included Bill Bean, Mike Evans, Larry Rankin, Howard Mclean, and Danny Banfield.  The song Weather Girl was a Semi-finalist in CBC National Searchlight Contest, and was also featured on Global TV.  And Get Off Your Ass and Dance and Òcean Blues have become crowd favorites in live shows.

Throughout the years The Saunders Brothers Show has built a reputation of being a unique, interactive comedy experience which includes pulling members of the audience up to participate in every part of the show.  They performed their 500th show in 2014, and the summer of 2015 set off on an extensive tour of festivals, corporate events and campgrounds across Nova Scotia and beyond.

Stage Presence 
 
The entertainment from a Saunders Brothers Show comes as much from the humorous banter between the band members, audience members, and even the staff of the host establishment. The Brothers incorporate a great deal of humour into their show in the form of dialogues between (and during) songs, jokes, and non sequiturs.

They are experts at gauging the interests and attitudes of given audiences and can subtly tailor every show to its complete entertainment potential, and some reviewers postulate this is why so many fans return for repeat shows. Wherever the venue, a Saunders Brothers Show can be very family-friendly yet offer a wink to subtle yet suggestive humour, intense entertainer/audience interaction, and a great deal of laughter.

A good example of the unique style of the Saunders Brothers Show is Bar Hopper, a Vietnamese carved wooden frog that appears at many Saunders Brothers Shows. Bar Hopper has a series of carved ridges on its back, and when the band plays the song "Old Black Toad", Ed Saunders (and guests from the audience) scrape a hollow wooden rod across these ridges to produce a crackling toad noise. Other weapons of audience musical talent include the ugly stick, washboard tie, tamboreens, drums, spoons, and various costumes of wigs or wiggyness!

Members
Terry Saunders – vocals, rhythm guitar, mandolin,
Ed Saunders    – lead guitar, vocals, the Bar Hopper (see "Stage Presence", above)
Brian Smeltzer – bass guitar, backup vocals, tom-tom

Discography
 Hallelujah (2006, single)
Saunders Brothers Show (2007, Album)
 Gospel-ish(2008, album)
 `SINGLES (2014 album)

References

Canadian folk music groups